The Promenade Shops at Saucon Valley is a lifestyle center located in Center Valley, Pennsylvania. Major stores include American Eagle Outfitters, Banana Republic, Barnes & Noble, Brooks Brothers, Fresh Market, Old Navy, and AMC Theatres with 16 screens including an IMAX theater.

History
The lifestyle center opened on October 27, 2006 at a cost of $125 million. A parade was held to celebrate the center's opening. The Promenade is home to the first L.L.Bean outfitter in the state of Pennsylvania. In January 2020, the center lost several stores, increasing its vacancy to 18 percent. Several more stores closed during the Promenade's March 17, 2020 to June 5, 2020 COVID-19 pandemic shutdown, increasing vacancy to 25 percent. Centennial Advisory Services and MSC took over leasing and management of The Promenade Shops at Saucon Valley in April 2022.

References

External links
Official website

2006 establishments in Pennsylvania
Buildings and structures in Lehigh County, Pennsylvania
IMAX venues
Lifestyle centers (retail)
Shopping malls established in 2006
Shopping malls in Lehigh County, Pennsylvania
Tourist attractions in Lehigh County, Pennsylvania